Zubarah is a coastal suburb to the North of Khor Fakkan, Sharjah, in the United Arab Emirates (UAE). It is the northernmost district of Khor Fakkan municipality.

References 

Populated places in the Emirate of Sharjah
Khor Fakkan